Dimitri Hadzi (March 21, 1921 – April 16, 2006) was an American abstract sculptor who lived and worked in Cambridge, Massachusetts, and also taught at Harvard University for over a decade.

Life
Hadzi was born to Greek-American immigrant parents in Greenwich Village, New York City on March 21, 1921. As a child, he attended a Greek after-school program, where he learned language, mythology, history, and theater. He also won a prize for drawing. After graduating from Brooklyn Technical High School, he worked as a chemist, while continuing his studies in chemistry by night.

In 1942, he signed up for the Army Air Force, serving in the South Pacific region while continuing to draw in his spare time. After his service, he returned to New York to study painting and sculpture at Cooper Union.

Hadzi taught studio arts at Harvard University, from 1975 to 1989.

Personal life
Hadzi married Martha Leeb, but later divorced. In June 1985, he married Cynthia von Thuna. He died in 2006 and was interred at Mount Auburn Cemetery in Cambridge, Massachusetts.

Works
Centaur (1954), in the garden of Prospect House in Princeton, New Jersey
 Elmo-MIT, 1960s
K. 458 The Hunt (1966), Avery Fisher Hall, New York City, refers to Mozart's String Quartet in B flat, K. 458
River Legend (1976), Edith Green – Wendell Wyatt Federal Building, Portland, Oregon
Thermopylae (1960s), John F. Kennedy Federal Building, Boston
Propylaea (1982), a sculptural fountain in Toledo, Ohio
Omphalos (1985), formerly at Harvard Square MBTA station through the Arts on the Line program, but was to be repaired and relocated to Rockport, Massachusetts
Helmet V, (1959-1961) Hirshhorn Museum and Sculpture Garden, Washington DC
Red Mountains (1991), Hugo L. Black United States Courthouse, Birmingham, Alabama. The sculpture, installed in 1991, was removed in 2012 for renovations to the building. A provision of the 2014 Financial Appropriations Act barred the General Services Administration from replacing it for fear that it could be used to shield an attacker.
 Elmo V (1961), The Governor Nelson A. Rockefeller Empire State Plaza Art Collection, Albany, NY

Awards
 1957 Guggenheim Fellow 
 1962 Venice Biennale
 1974 Rome Prize
 1990 National Academy of Design, Associate member
 1994 National Academy of Design,  full Academician

Removal of artworks

Some of Hadzi's public artworks have been removed since his death, as noted above. The artwork was the centerpiece of Boston's Copley Place indoor shopping mall, and was composed of multiple abstract granite and travertine marble shapes, with a waterfall cascading down it into a shallow pool at the bottom, surrounded by marble benches. , there was scant remaining evidence the fountain had ever existed, and the ownership, location, and status of its components were unknown to the general public.

References

External links

Oral history interview with Dimitri Hadzi, 1981 Jan. 2-1990 Mar. 9

1921 births
2006 deaths
Harvard University faculty
Artists from New York City
Sculptors from Massachusetts
Cooper Union alumni
United States Army Air Forces personnel of World War II
American people of Greek descent
20th-century American sculptors
20th-century male artists
American male sculptors
Sculptors from New York (state)
Burials at Mount Auburn Cemetery
Members of the American Academy of Arts and Letters